Fritz X was the most common name for a German guided anti-ship glide bomb used during World War II. Fritz X was the world's first precision guided weapon deployed in combat and the first to sink a ship in combat. Fritz X was a nickname used both by Allied and Luftwaffe personnel. Alternative names include Ruhrstahl SD 1400 X, Kramer X-1, PC 1400X or FX 1400 (the latter, along with the unguided PC 1400 Fritz nickname, is the origin for the name "Fritz X").

History 

Fritz X was a further development of the PC 1400 (Panzersprengbombe, Cylindrisch 1,400 kg) armour-piercing high-explosive bomb, itself bearing the nickname Fritz. It was a penetration weapon intended to be used against armored targets such as heavy cruisers and battleships. It was given a more aerodynamic nose, four stub wings, and a box-shaped tail unit consisting of a roughly 12-sided annular set of fixed surfaces and a cruciform tail with thick surfaces within the annulus, which contained the Fritz Xs aerodynamic controls.

The Luftwaffe recognized the difficulty of hitting moving ships during the Spanish Civil War.  Dipl. engineer Max Kramer, who worked at the Deutsche Versuchsanstalt für Luftfahrt (DVL) had been experimenting since 1938 with remote-controlled free-falling  bombs and in 1939 fitted radio-controlled spoilers. In 1940,  was invited to join the development, since they already had experience in the development and production of unguided bombs.

Fritz X was guided by a Kehl-Strasbourg radio control link, which sent signals to the movable spoilers in the thick vertical and horizontal tail fin surfaces, within the annular tail fin structure. This control system was also used for the unarmored, rocket-boosted Henschel Hs 293 anti-ship ordnance, itself first deployed on 25 August 1943. The Straßburg receiver antenna installations on the Fritz X were aerodynamically integrated into the trailing edge of the annular surfaces of the tail fin, non-metallically encapsulated within a quartet of "bulged" sections in the trailing edge. This design feature of the FuG 230 Straßburg receiver installation is not entirely unlike the Azon (US contemporary guided bomb), which had its own receiving antennas placed in the quartet of diagonal struts bracing the fixed sections of its tail fins.

As it was an MCLOS-guidance ordnance design, the operator had to keep the bomb in sight at all times (a tail flare was provided, as with the Azon, to assist the operator in tracking the weapon) and the control aircraft had to hold course, which made evading gunfire or fighters impossible. Approximately 1,400 examples, including trial models, were produced.

Control setup 

The Fritz X possessed a spoiler-based control setup on its tailfin unit, using three sets of aerodynamic control spoiler systems, with two of them giving the ordnance control in both the pitch and yaw axes, differentially operating and constantly oscillating rapidly under direct control from the Kehl-Straßburg radio control link. The roll control setup, operating autonomously and not under control from the deploying aircraft, similarly oscillated to those under the externally controlled sets and were located on the outboard sections of the horizontal tailfin surfaces within the annular set of outer tailfin surfaces. These were like the American Azon ordnance's own "aileron" control surfaces in their purpose, commanded by an internal gyroscope in the tail's central housing in both the Azon and Fritz X, to keep the ordnance level during its trajectory.  The inboard set of spoiler surfaces in the tailfin's horizontal surfaces, which used a set of wing fence-like flat surfaces for airflow separation from the autonomous roll control spoilers, controlled the pitch angle after release and were controlled by the radio control link, giving the Fritz X's bombardier in the deploying aircraft the ability to control the range of the drop, a capability that the Azon ordnance did not have.  The yaw control spoilers housed in the vertical tailfin surfaces were also under control through the radio link, and had similar "fence" surfaces to guide airflow over them.  All three spoiler surface sets, when deployed, barely protruded from the surface during operation, with the pair of spoiler systems under external control having a degree of "proportionality" in their operation by varying the "dwell time" spent on one side or the other during their rapid rate of oscillation from side to side when a control input was sent to them.

Combat procedure 

The Fritz X was steered by the bombardier in the launching aircraft over a radio link between the aircraft's Kehl transmitter and the weapon's Straßburg receiver. The bombardier had to be able to see the target at all times, and like the Azon ordnance, the Fritz X bomb had a flare in the tail so it could be seen from the controlling aircraft for its MCLOS-form guidance to control it properly. The disadvantage with this — in comparison to fully autonomous-guidance glide bombs like the operational U.S. Navy's Bat radar-homing glide bomb, used against Japan in 1944–45 — were that the aircraft had to be flown toward the target on a steady course and that as the missile neared its target it became possible to misguide by jamming its radio channel.

Unlike the Hs 293, which was deployed against merchant ships and light escorting warships, the Fritz X was intended to be used against armoured ships such as heavy cruisers and battleships. The Fritz X had to be released at least  from the target. The plane had to decelerate immediately after bomb release so the bombardier could see the bomb and guide it; this deceleration was achieved by making a steep climb and then levelling out. The bomber was vulnerable to fighter attack as well as ship-based air defense weapons while maintaining a slow, steady course so the bombardier could maintain visual contact to guide the bomb. When working properly, the missile was able to pierce 130 mm (5.1 in) of armor.

Accuracy is the main reason for developing a weapon system of this kind, rather than continuing to use so-called "dumb bombs". A skilled bombardier could manage to guide 50% of the bombs to within a 15 m (50 ft) radius of the aiming point, and about 90% hit within a 30 m (100 ft) radius (other sources say 60% hits within 4.6 metre radius).

Usage in combat 

The only Luftwaffe unit to deploy the Fritz X was Gruppe III of Kampfgeschwader 100 Wiking (Viking), designated III./KG 100; the bomber wing itself evolved as the larger-sized descendant of the earlier Kampfgruppe 100 unit in mid-December 1941. This unit employed the medium range Dornier Do 217K-2 bomber on almost all of its attack missions, though, in a few cases toward the end of its deployment history, Dornier Do 217K-3 and M-11 variants were also used.  The Fritz X had been initially tested with a Heinkel He 111 bomber, although it was never taken into combat by this aircraft. A few special variants of the troublesome Heinkel He 177A Greif long-range bomber were equipped with the Kehl transmitter and proper bombracks to carry the Fritz X, and it is thought that this combination might have seen limited combat service, at least with the combinations known to have been involved in test drops. It was found that the launch aircraft had to "toss" the bomb slightly, climbing and then descending, to keep it in view ahead.

The Fritz X was first deployed on 21 July 1943 in a raid on Augusta harbour in Sicily. A number of additional attacks around Sicily and Messina followed, though no confirmed hits were made and it appears the Allies were unaware that the large bombs being dropped were radio-guided weapons.

On 9 September, the Luftwaffe achieved their greatest success with the weapon. After Pietro Badoglio publicly announced the Italian armistice with the Allies on 8 September 1943, the Italian fleet had steamed out from La Spezia and headed to Tunisia. To prevent the ships from falling into Allied hands, six Do 217K-2s from III. Gruppe of KG 100 (III/KG 100) took off, each carrying a single Fritz X. The Italian battleship , flagship of the Italian fleet, received two hits and one near miss, and sank after her magazines exploded. 1,393 men, including Admiral Carlo Bergamini, died. Her sister ship, Italia, was also seriously damaged but reached Tunisia.

The American light cruiser  was hit by Fritz Xs at 10:00 AM on 11 September 1943 during the invasion of Salerno, and was forced to retire to the United States for eight months of repairs. A single Fritz X passed through the roof of "C" turret and killed the turret crew and a damage control party when it exploded in the lower ammunition-handling room. The blast tore a large hole in the ship's bottom, opened a seam in her side, and blew out all fires in her boiler rooms. Savannah lay dead in the water with her forecastle nearly awash, and eight hours elapsed before her boilers were relit, allowing the Savannah to get under way for Malta. USS Savannah lost 197 crewmen in this attack. Fifteen other sailors were seriously wounded, and four more were trapped in a watertight compartment for 60 hours. These four sailors were not rescued until Savannah had already arrived at Grand Harbor, Valletta, Malta on 12 September.

Savannahs sister ship, had been targeted earlier that same morning. While it is often believed that the ship was hit by a Fritz X, in fact the bomb just missed the ship, exploding about 15 meters away. Damage was minimal.

The Royal Navy's light cruiser  was hit by a Fritz X off Salerno at 14:40 on 13 September. The Fritz X passed through seven decks and straight through her keel, exploding underwater just under the keel. The concussive shock of the Fritz X's underwater detonation close to Ugandas hull extinguished all her boiler fires, and resulted in sixteen men being killed, with Uganda taking on 1,300 tons of water. Uganda was towed to Malta for repairs.

Two merchant ships may have been hit by Fritz X bombs at Salerno, though the evidence is uncertain. SS Bushrod Washington was hit by a glide bomb, either a Fritz X or a Hs 293, on 14 September while offloading a cargo of gasoline. SS James W. Marshall was set afire by a conventional bomb, Hs 293 or Fritz X on 15 September. As with Bushrod Washington, the nature of the weapon that damaged James W. Marshall is uncertain. A witness aboard a ship nearby, Joseph A. Yannacci, attributes the attack to Ju 87 "Stuka" dive bombers, which were too small to carry glide bombs. While an attack with a Fritz X cannot be ruled out, there is at least an equal case to suggest that, if a glide bomb was involved, the culprit was actually a Hs 293 from II./KG 100; Luftwaffe records show that II./KG 100, armed only with Hs 293 glide bombs, was active over Salerno that day.

KG 100 achieved another success with Fritz X while the British battleship  was providing gunfire support at Salerno on 16 September. One bomb penetrated six decks before exploding in number 4 boiler room. This explosion put out all fires and blew out the double bottom. A second Fritz X near-missed Warspite, holing her at the waterline. She took on a total of 5,000 tonnes of water and lost steam and consequently all power, both to the ship herself and to all her systems, but although the damage had been considerable, Warspites casualties amounted to only nine killed and fourteen wounded.

The last Fritz X attack at Salerno lightly damaged the US light cruiser Philadelphia with two near misses on 17 September. This attack is sometimes reported as taking place on 18 September. However, according to US Navy records, the cruiser Philadelphia departed Salerno the night of 17/18 September.  Moreover, according to Luftwaffe records, III./KG 100, the Luftwaffe unit armed with the Fritz X, flew its last mission on 17 September. Other ships damaged by Fritz-X included Dutch sloop  and British destroyer .

Electronic countermeasures 
The control system used by the Fritz X relied on radio contact between the bomb and the guidance unit, and was susceptible to electronic countermeasures. After the initial attacks in August 1943, the Allies went to considerable effort to develop jamming devices. These were first deployed in late September 1943, too late for Salerno. The system met with some success, although it proved cumbersome and easily overwhelmed if large numbers of weapons were deployed simultaneously.

In early 1944, as the U.S. Army was engaged in the Battle of Anzio, the United Kingdom began to deploy its Type 650 transmitter, which employed a different approach to interfering with the FuG 203/230 radio link on a Fritz X, by jamming the Straßburg receiver's intermediate frequency (IF) section. The FuG 230 receiver's IF section operated at a 3 MHz frequency, and the Type 650 appears to have been quite successful in interfering with Fritz X ordnance deployments, especially because the operator did not have to attempt to find which of the eighteen selected Kehl-Straßburg command frequencies were in use and then manually tune the jamming transmitter to one of them. The Type 650 automatically defeated the receiver, regardless which radio frequency had been selected for a missile.

By the time of the Normandy landings, a combination of Allied air supremacy (keeping the Luftwaffe's bombers at bay) and ship-mounted jammers meant that the Fritz X had no significant effect on the invasion fleet. Some accounts report that the Norwegian destroyer  was hit by a Fritz X at dawn on D-Day. This is unlikely, as III./KG 100, the unit which had carried the Fritz X into combat, had largely been re-equipped with the Hs 293 by that time for its anti-ship missions, and the attack on Svenner occurred before the first glide bombers launched their assaults on the Normandy beaches.

The Fritz X has been credited as responsible for the loss of the hospital ship  at Salerno as well as the destroyer  and the light cruiser  at Anzio; however, these ships were actually hit by Hs 293s, as demonstrated by the nature of the damage inflicted, as well as by reports from witnesses (in the case of Janus, either an Hs 293 or a conventional torpedo was responsible).

Operators
Luftwaffe (Nazi Germany)

See also 
 List of World War II guided missiles of Germany
 Kramer X4- Max Kramer's air-to-air guided missile
 Ki-147
 Ki-148
 Ohka
 Project Pigeon
 Gargoyle
 GB-4
 GB-8
 VB-3 Razon

References
Explanatory notes

Citations

External links

 |The Development of precision guided Bombs
 USAAF-captured (1946) German wartime film on details of the Fritz X bomb
 The Dawn of the Smart Bomb
 German guided weapons of World War II
 Allied & German guided weapons of World War II
 Smithsonian National Air and Space Museum 
 National Museum of the U.S. Air Force
 Ruhrstahl AG Fritz-X – Royal Air Force Museum, Cosford (UK)
 "How Radio-Controlled Bombs Were Jammed", C.I.C. (Combat Information Center), U.S. Office of the Chief of Naval Operations, Dec. 1945.

World War II guided missiles of Germany
Anti-ship missiles of Germany
Guided bombs
Weapons and ammunition introduced in 1943
German inventions of the Nazi period